Mesfin (Amharic: መስፍን) is a male name of Ethiopian origin that may refer to:

People with the given name 

 Mesfin Hagos, militant and founding member of the Eritrean People's Liberation Front
 Mesfin Negash, Ethiopian journalist
 Mesfin Woldemariam (born 1930), Ethiopian human right activist and philosopher

People with the surname 

 Azeb Mesfin, Ethiopian politician and widow Meles Zenawi
 Hunegnaw Mesfin (born 1989), Ethiopian long-distance runner
Nahom Mesfin Tariku (born 1989), Ethiopian steeplechase runner
Seyoum Mesfin (1949–2021), Ethiopian politician and diplomat

See also 

Amharic-language names